Drepanosiphum platanoidis is a species of insect, commonly known as the sycamore aphid. It undergoes both parthenogenic and sexual reproduction.

References

Insects described in 1801
Agricultural pest insects
Aphididae